Microbacterium deminutum is a Gram-positive and non-motile bacterium from the genus Microbacterium.

References

Further reading 
 

Bacteria described in 2006
deminutum